Why Girls Leave Home is a 1945 American drama film directed by William Berke, written by Fanya Foss and Bradford Ropes, and starring Lola Lane, Sheldon Leonard, and Pamela Blake. The film's composer, Walter Greene, was nominated for an Academy Award for Best Original Score in 1945. Also, Jay Livingston and Ray Evans were nominated for Academy Award for Best Original Song for "The Cat and the Canary".

Cast
Lola Lane as Irene Mitchell
Sheldon Leonard as Chris Williams
Pamela Blake as Diana Leslie
Elisha Cook Jr. as Jimmie Lobo
Paul Guilfoyle as Steve Raymond
Constance Worth as Flo
Claudia Drake as Marien Mason
Virginia Brissac as Mrs. Leslie
Thomas Jackson as Reilly
Peggy Lou Bianco as Peggy Leslie
Evelynne Eaton as Alice
Fred Kohler as Ted Leslie

Production
Philip Yordan says he wrote the script in three days. He says he was approached by Edward Small who had set up the picture at Republic for which actors had been hired and sets built, but Herbert Yates head of the studio did not like the script. Small said Yates would finance if Yordan wrote the script, so he started on Friday, dictated it on Saturday and Sunday morning. Filming began on Monday.

References

External links

1945 films
1945 drama films
American drama films
American black-and-white films
Producers Releasing Corporation films
Films directed by William A. Berke
1940s American films